nunet was a global provider of mobile and IPTV video management technologies for broadcasters, media brands and Mobile Network Operators. The Mobile TV CMS product provides broadcasters with the ability to aggregate, encode, optimise and schedule live, looped and VOD channels for broadcast to mobile devices and IPTV platforms.
 
The company's Mobile TV CMS is in use by a wide range of Mobile Network Operators globally to include the Vodafone Group, Vodacom, SFR, Proximus and Mobilkom A1; distributing content from a wide range of broadcasters and producers to include Eurosport, MTV, Discovery and Fashion TV. 
 
Founded in 1997, nunet AG was acquired by IMG (business) in 2006 and later in 2009 by KIT Digital, Inc. and was based in Cologne, Germany and London, UK.

External links
Nunet AG Official site
Reallife Official site
MobiTV Official site
IMG

See also
GoTV Networks

Mobile telephone broadcasting
Streaming television